Aswan Stadium is a stadium in Aswan, Egypt. It has a capacity of 11,000 spectators.  It is the home of Aswan SC.

References

Football venues in Egypt